Alghero - Riviera del Corallo Airport  is an international airport situated  north-northwest of the city of Alghero, in northern Sardinia, Italy. It is also known as Alghero–Fertilia Airport, named for the nearby village of Fertilia or Alghero Airport. It is one of the three main airports serving Sardinia, the other ones being Olbia in the northeast, and near Cagliari in the south. The airport is operated by SO.GE.A.AL (Societa di Gestione Aeroporto di Alghero).

History

Early years
The airport opened in March 1938 as a military airport. During World War II, it was equipped with a 700-metre runway. Following the war, the runway was lengthened and improved.

During the early 1960s, the civil activities moved on the east side of the property and an old hangar was used as a passenger terminal. In 1971, the first passenger terminal was built. In the middle of the 1970s, the runway was lengthened to the current 3,000 meters, one of the longest runways in Italy and one of the safest.

In 1980, Alitalia established a flight school at Alghero Airport which trained up to 100 pilots a year, in conjunction with a diversification of activities including air taxi and maintenance services. The school closed in March 2003.

Development in the 2000s
At the end of February 2006, there was a disagreement between the municipalities of Sassari and Alghero concerning the name of the airport (by then called "Alghero-Riviera del Corallo" or "Alghero-Fertilia airport". It was suggested by Sassari administration (capital of province near Alghero) that the name should be changed to "Sassari-Alghero", which was the name used by Alitalia to advertise the first flights to the airport, but actually Alitalia used "Alghero-Sassari".. The discussions came to nothing and the name recognized by Italian (ENAV) and the international aviation authorities, besides the majority of people remains "Alghero-Fertilia", although the intention of the airport management company is to change the name to "Alghero-Riviera del Corallo".

On 23 November 2007, management of the airport was transferred to SO.GE.A.AL. for a period of 40 years.

The terminal building was recently renovated and expanded with the construction of a new terminal, which allowed the airport to expand the services offered to travelers. A renovation of the old terminal is planned to transform it into a shopping mall. On 9 April 2008, the new departures and arrivals halls were inaugurated in the presence of civil authorities, the military and the Bishop of the Diocese of Alghero-Bosa Giacomo Lanzetti. This expanded the terminal area from 8,000 m2 to approximately 14,000 m2.

30 March 2009, Alghero Airport became a Ryanair airline hub, with two aircraft with their crews based there. The airport's relationship with the Irish company has not always been smooth. For example, in August 2009, Ryanair announced it would discontinue the routes between Frankfurt Hahn and Madrid from October of the same year in addition to withdrawing various seasonal flights. The matter was eventually resolved and the routes were not cancelled. In January 2010, Ryanair asked for further subsidies from the local authorities. When this was refused, Ryanair announced it would cut seven routes to and from the airport. The local government signed agreements with Meridiana Fly and Alitalia to take over some routes, ending Ryanair's near monopoly on international flights from the airport. However the new routes were quickly cancelled due to poor load-factors. Ryanair has resumed some of the cancelled routes (although flights to Hahn and Charleroi ended in October 2013) and remains the dominant carrier at the airport.

Since 27 October 2013, with the entry into force of the new Territorial Continuity Sardinien, the airline Livingston connected the Alghero airport with the Rome-Fiumicino Airport; this route was operated in the past by Alitalia. The company, following a conference held at Alghero airport in early November, announced that the Riviera del Corallo became its fifth base of operations, after Milan-Malpensa, Rome-Fiumicino, Rimini and Verona. But on 29 April 2014, the Autonomous Region of Sardinia decided to revoke the route Alghero - Rome - Fiumicino to New Livingston for "serious breaches", entrusting it again to Alitalia, runner in the contract notice for the Territorial Continuity of Sardinia. Therefore, as of 4 May 2014, with the flight Rome - Fiumicino - Alghero of 21:25, Alitalia resumed the route in territorial continuity. On 29 April 2014, Livingston, submitting an appeal to the TAR of Lazio , obtained a suspension of the provision of the Autonomous Region of Sardinia. On 15 May 2014, the TAR of Lazio declined jurisdiction in the matter and sent the case to the Administrative Court of Sardinia that on 29 May the same year, confirming the decline of New Livingston from territorial continuity service on Alghero - Rome - Fiumicino. The Council of State rejected the appeal of the Milan-based company, allowing Alitalia to operate the route again. Subsequently, on 7 October 2014, Livingston communicated ENAC (the Italian National Agency for Civil Aviation), the suspension of all flights, because of the collapse of tourism, especially the segment holiday to Egypt and the Mediterranean basin, which has collapsed after the Arab Spring and the consequent instability of the area, and the drastic reduction in demand for routes to Russia because of the ongoing political crisis. As a result, the ENAC took steps to suspend the air transport license of the airline.

In October 2015, Ryanair announced that it would be closing its base at Alghero and dropping 16 routes from October that year, leaving only five routes served by aircraft based elsewhere for the winter 2015–2016 season.

In July 2016, Ryanair announced it would re-establish its base in Alghero and resume many routes after the decision of Italian government to rescind the increase in airport taxes from October 2016.

As of November 2017, Alitalia and the Romanian low-cost company Blue Air have bases here, with a handful of several other low-cost companies, such as easyJet, Ryanair, Vueling and Wizz Air, also offering all-year-round flights to various destinations in Italy, Spain and Romania, but also seasonal flights to other European countries.

Airlines and destinations
The following airlines operate regular scheduled and charter flights at Alghero–Fertilia Airport:

Statistics

Ground transportation
The airport can be reached from the city via the Strada Statale 42 and from the rest of the island via the SS 131 Carlo Felice Highway and the SS 291. The Sardinian transport operator ARST operates urban public transport lines between Alghero and the airport and also to Sassari, Olbia and Cagliari. There are also seasonal links by private companies from Cagliari and Santa Teresa Gallura.

References

External links 

Official site (English)
"A brief history of the Alghero airport" of Valter Battistoni, Sun Editions, . (2012) Alghero 

Airports in Sardinia
Alghero